The Altrincham and Sale by-election was held on 4 February 1965 when the incumbent Conservative MP, Fred Erroll was raised to a hereditary peerage as Baron Erroll of Hale, of Kilmun in the County of Argyll.  It was won by the Conservative candidate Anthony Barber, who returned after losing his Doncaster constituency in the 1964 general election.

References

Altrincham and Sale by-election
Altrincham and Sale by-election
20th century in Cheshire
Elections in Trafford
By-elections to the Parliament of the United Kingdom in Cheshire constituencies
By-elections to the Parliament of the United Kingdom in Greater Manchester constituencies
Altrincham
Sale, Greater Manchester
Altrincham and Sale by-election